Clifty Falls State Park is an Indiana state park on  in Jefferson County, Indiana in the United States. The park attracts about 370,000 visitors annually.

On October 27, 1920, citizens of Madison, Indiana gave the land for the park, to the state of Indiana at the suggestion of Richard Lieber.  This was after a year's work by the citizens.  A system of naturalist programs for Indiana state parks started in 1927, with Clifty Falls being one of the first four with one.

The park features Clifty Creek, Little Clifty Creek, and a canyon in which the sun only shines during midday.

It has many beautiful nature trails, especially those that go near Clifty Falls. The Clifty Inn is available for overnight guests, and the park contains a campground with sites for RV and tent campers.

Canyons
Clifty Creek Canyon traverses the entire north-south length of the state park. The creek descends down to about  before dropping over one of the two Clifty Falls. Then it runs downward until reaching the Ohio River. Two other major canyons enter Clifty Creek Canyon from the east, they are Deans Branch (Tunnel Falls) and Hoffman Branch (Hoffman Falls).

Waterfalls
Clifty Falls State Park is named for the waterfalls on Clifty Creek.
 Big Clifty Falls  - 
 Little Clifty Falls  - 
 Hoffman Falls  - 
 Tunnel Falls  -

Trails
Clifty Falls State Park has ten trails that vary from easy, moderate, rugged and very rugged. Trail two is the only very rugged trail and it is the most rugged trail in all of Indiana. Because of the danger of falling rocks, the end of the trail is blocked from the public. There are old steps, also blocked, that used to lead down to the falls. You can see the falls from an overlook carved out of the side of the canyon.

Gallery

See also
 List of Indiana state parks

References

 (official site)

Protected areas established in 1920
State parks of Indiana
Protected areas of Jefferson County, Indiana
Waterfalls of Indiana
Canyons and gorges of Indiana
Nature centers in Indiana
Landforms of Jefferson County, Indiana